KAS Australia is a designer and manufacturer of bed linen, cushions, throws, comforters and sheet sets home fragrances and bath towels. It is based in the  Sydney suburb of Alexandria, New South Wales.

History
KAS started in 1970 as a small side business selling at Sydney's Paddington markets. The side project turned into a business and after 30 years the two owners have become the directors of KAS Australia, one of the country's most successful bedlinen brands, selling to 42 countries worldwide and gaining loyal fans with their signature collections.

The name KAS comes from an acronym for Karen and Steve.

Family
Karen and Steve have two sons that work in the business. Ben has been employed by KAS for 13 years and is the organisation's creative brand director. He is responsible for overseeing the company's website and fashion-forward catalogues. Daniel has been employed by KAS for 1 year and is the Marketing executive.

References

1970 establishments in Australia
Companies based in Sydney